The skew binary number system is a non-standard positional numeral system in which the nth digit contributes a value of  times the digit (digits are indexed from 0) instead of  times as they do in binary.  Each digit has a value of 0, 1, or 2. A number can have many skew binary representations. For example, a decimal number 15 can be written as 1000, 201 and 122. Each number can be written uniquely in skew binary canonical form where there is only at most one instance of the digit 2, which must be the least significant nonzero digit. In this case 15 is written canonically as 1000.

Examples
Canonical skew binary representations of the numbers from 0 to 15 are shown in following table:

Arithmetical operations
The advantage of skew binary is that each increment operation can be done with at most one carry operation. This exploits the fact that . Incrementing a skew binary number is done by setting the only two to a zero and incrementing the next digit from zero to one or one to two. When numbers are represented using a form of run-length encoding as linked lists of the non-zero digits, incrementation and decrementation can be performed in constant time.

Other arithmetic operations may be performed by switching between the skew binary representation and the binary representation.

From skew binary representation to binary representation
A more efficient method is now given, with only bit representation and one subtraction.

The skew binary number of the form  without 2 and with  1s is equal to the binary number  minus . Let  represents the digit  repeated  times. The skew binary number of the form  with  1s is equal to the binary number  minus .

From binary representation to skew binary representation
Similarly to the preceding section, the binary number  of the form  with  1s equals the skew binary number  plus . Note that since addition is not defined, adding  corresponds to incrementing the number  times. Hence transforming a binary number into a skew binary number runs in time linear in the length of the number.

Applications
The skew binary numbers were developed by Eugene Myers in 1983 for a purely functional data structure that allows the operations of the stack abstract data type and also allows efficient indexing into the sequence of stack elements. They were later applied to skew binomial heaps, a variant of binomial heaps that support constant-time worst-case insertion operations.

See also
 Three-valued logic
 Redundant binary representation
 n-ary Gray code

Notes

Number theory
Functional programming
Computer arithmetic
Non-standard positional numeral systems